Thynnus is a genus of wasps in the family Thynnidae.

Selected species
Thynnus brenchleyi Smith, 1873
Thynnus brisbanensis Turner, 1909
Thynnus conator Turner, 1910
Thynnus cookii Turner, 1910
Thynnus darwiniensis Turner, 1908
Thynnus dentatus Fabricius, 1775
Thynnus elgneri Turner, 1908
Thynnus emarginatus Fabricius, 1775
Thynnus pedestris (Fabricius, 1775)
Thynnus pulchralis Smith, 1859
Thynnus sabulosus Turner, 1908
Thynnus ventralis Smith, 1865
Thynnus zonatus Guérin-Méneville, 1838

References
AFD: Checklist of Thynnus species

Thynnidae
Hymenoptera genera